The Secret Between the Shadow and the Soul is a live album by the Branford Marsalis Quartet. The album received a Grammy Award nomination for Best Jazz Instrumental Album.

Track listing 
 "Dance of the Evil Toys" (Eric Revis) – 8:23
 "Conversation Among the Ruins" (Joey Calderazzo) – 8:46
 "Snake Hip Waltz" (Andrew Hill) – 5:51
 "Cianna" (Joey Calderazzo) – 7:32
 "Nilaste" (Eric Revis) – 10:15
 "Life Filtering from the Water Flowers" (Branford Marsalis) – 9:00
 "The Windup" (Keith Jarrett) – 12:30

References

External links 

 Branford Marsalis Discography. branfordmarsalis.com.

2019 albums
Branford Marsalis albums